Robert of Vermandois ( – ) was Count of Meaux and Count of Troyes, son of Herbert II, Count of Vermandois and his wife, Adele of France, daughter of Robert I of France.

Robert succeeded his father as Count of Meaux in 943 and became Count of Troyes in 956. His son Herbert III of Meaux succeeded as Count of Troyes and Meaux upon Robert's death in 967.

Robert married Adelais (914–967) of Burgundy, daughter of Giselbert, Duke of Burgundy. They had:

Herbert III, Count of Meaux ( – 995)
Adele of Meaux ( – )

References

Sources

Herbertien dynasty
Counts of Meaux
900s births
960s deaths
Year of birth uncertain
Year of death uncertain